Chepareria is a town located in West Pokot County, Rift Valley Province of Kenya. Under the Kenya's Independent Electoral and Boundaries Commission (IEBC), Chepareria town was named the administrative headquarters of Pokot South Constituency.

References 

Populated places in West Pokot County